Cristian Exequiel Zabala (born 4 March 1998) is an Argentine professional footballer who plays as a midfielder for Tigre.

Career
Zabala began with Quilmes. He made his professional debut against Atlético de Rafaela on 27 August 2018, coming off the substitutes bench after seventy-eight minutes in place of Augusto Max. After another sub appearance versus Los Andes in the succeeding September, Zabala's first start in senior football arrived during a 1–1 draw away to Villa Dálmine on 20 October.

On 26 October 2020, Zabala joined Tigre.

Career statistics
.

References

External links

1998 births
Living people
Sportspeople from Buenos Aires Province
Argentine footballers
Association football midfielders
Primera Nacional players
Argentine Primera División players
Quilmes Atlético Club footballers
Club Atlético Tigre footballers